William George "Jock" Ross (born 5 August 1943) is a Scottish-born Australian outlaw biker, best known as the founder and the "Supreme Commander" of the Comanchero Motorcycle Club and for his involvement in the Milperra massacre of 1984.

Youth
Ross was born in Glasgow, Scotland into a working class family. Ross grew up in the Gorbals neighborhood of Glasgow, where his father worked as a lorry (truck) driver. Ross stated of his youth: "In the old Glasgow days you never backed off, that’s how you survived. The Gorbals was tough and you had to be tough too." He served in the British Army in the Royal Engineers. Ross joined the British Army at the age of 17 and served for 7 years. As an engineer, he was involved in clearing minefields left over from the Second World War in Libya as well as laying minefields in the Aden Protectorate (modern Yemen) and Hong Kong. After his honorable discharge, he settled in Australia, making his home in New South Wales. In 1966, he settled in a coastal flat and then moved to Point Clare. Ross-who was known to his friends as "Jock" instead of William-worked variously as a lorry driver and as an apprentice blacksmith.

The Comancheros
Ross befriended a number of Australian veterans of the Vietnam war, saying in a 2019 interview: "I came out of the army, came here. People come out of the army, especially soldiers coming back from Vietnam back in the '70s, the late '70s … they came, and they were treated like lepers … not real good. Me, as an ex-soldier, I empathised with them". Ross founded Comanchero Motorcycle Club in 1968 with the name being taken from a 1961 John Wayne Western film The Comancheros that Ross adored. The Australian journalists Lindsay Simpson and Sandra Harvey described Ross as a natural "leader of men", an extremely charismatic man whose machismo and toughness inspired much devotion from other men. In 1971, Ross purchased a property along the then rural Mangrove Mountain Road for $800 dollars that became his home. Settling with Ross in his caravan were his first wife Sandy and their infant daughter Deidre. Ross found the sunny New South Wales countryside to be a refreshing change from the decaying industrial neighborhoods of the Gorbals where he had grown up.  Ross had known a number of motorcycle riders who liked to drink in the pubs along a coastal road north of Sydney and persuaded them to join the Comancheros. In late 1973, Ross led the Comancheros in series of brawls against another outlaw biker club, the Kings. In response to a warning from the Newcastle police, Ross relocated the Comancheros to the Sydney suburb of Parramatta. Ross hung a sign on the wall of the Comancheros' clubhouse that read: "If it's white, sniff it/If it's female or it moves, fuck it/If it narks-kill it".

Ross had an intensely authoritarian leadership style shaped by his military background and he gave himself the grandiose title of the "Supreme Commander". He was described as leading with "an iron fist". Like many other outlaw bikers, Ross's politics tended towards the extreme right and he had a gigantic Nazi swastika flag prominently hanging on the wall of the Parramatta clubhouse. Ross had the new members of the Comancheros swear allegiance to not only the Comanchero club, but also to himself as the "Supreme Commander". Ross led his men on weekly para-military drills intended to prepare them for brawls against rival bikers. The Comancheros were considered to be the most violent of Australia's many outlaw biker clubs in the 1970s and 1980s as Ross was constantly engaged in biker wars. The Canadian journalists Julian Sher and William Marsden wrote that Ross was well known for planning his attacks "with military precision". Besides for the endless drilling, Ross formed his own elite force of especially tough fighters, which he called the Strike Force. Many Comancheros disliked Ross as one former member told the media: "If I wanted to march around in the fuckin' backyard, I would had joined the fuckin' army". One member who joined the Comancheros in 1974 who idolised Ross was Anthony "Snodgrass" Spencer who saw him as a surrogate father who provided him with the love he never received from the father he had never known. Peter Edwards, the crime correspondent  of The Toronto Star, described Spencer as very much a surrogate son to Ross. However, relations between Ross and Spencer went into decline when Spencer was not invited to Ross's second wedding. Ross's bride, Vanessa Eaves, had vetoed having Spencer at the wedding under the grounds that: "Snoddy is always stoned and you know how stupid he gets. I'm not going to have him ruin my wedding".  

In June 1983, the Comancheros became involved in a dispute with the Loners Motorcycle club. Ross led a raid on the Loners' clubhouse that ended with the three Loners present at the time of the raid being beaten bloody. Ross then suggested a meeting to discuss a truce, which proved to be ruse. When the Loners arrived in the back ally for the meeting, they were surrounded and beaten up by a superior forces of Comancheros armed with baseball bats who took away their "colours". Ross forced the Loners to become a "feeder club" (i.e a puppet club) for the Comancheros, which he named the Bandileros. There was continuing tension between the former Loners versus the original Comancheros. In addition, many Comancheros disliked Ross's leadership style, which was considered to be too authoritarian. The British journalist Annie Brown described Ross as "manipulative, violent and domineering". Colin "Caesar" Campbell, one of the anti-Ross Comancheros alleges that he and his brothers discovered that Ross was having an affair with another member's wife, which was a violation of the Comanchero rules.

The spokesman for the discontent in the ranks was Spencer. To avoid having to answer the charges he violated his own rules against sleeping with the wife of another Comanchero, Ross split the Comancheros into two chapters; the ones unhappy with his leadership, led by Spencer, were assigned to a new chapter in Birchgrove. The Birchgrove chapter at 105 Louisa Road with Spencer as the chapter president opened in August 1983. In February 1984, Ross opened up a new chapter under his leadership in Harris Park. Campbell has stated that Ross broke up the Comancheros up to avoid answering the charges that he had violated his own rules against sleeping with the wife of another member. Continuing tensions between the two chapters led to the Birchgrove chapter under Spencer breaking away to join the Bandidos Motorcycle Club in November 1983. Ross demanded the return of the former Comanchero colours, a demand that was only partially met as a number of the Comanchero colours had been mailed off to Texas, which proved to be a major sore point.

The Milperra Massacre   
Over the course of 1983 and 1984, relations between the Bandidos and the Comancheros grew increasingly tense. Following an incident on 9 August 1984 when three Comancheros were beaten up by the Bandidos, the two clubs became involved in a biker war starting on 11 August 1984. Later on 11 August, Ross had the Comanchero clubhouse fortified. During a phone call, Ross and Spencer laid out their rules for the "war" such as no fights in public places or the homes of members, which both sides completely ignored. Ross believed wrongly that Spencer and the other Bandidos were terrified of him, and all that was required was a show of force on the part of the Comancheros to win the biker war. 

On 2 September 1984 at the parking lot of the Viking Tavern in the Sydney suburb of Milperra, the two gangs clashed during a swap meet hosted by the British Motorcycle Club. During a swap meet, used and new motorcycle parts along with motorcycle-related memorabilia and trinkets were put on the market while barbecue food and alcohol were sold in plentiful quantities. Despite his later claims at his trial in 1985 and 1986 that no violence was planned, Ross had his men armed with knives, baseball bats, shotguns and rifles as he knew that Spencer and the Bandidos would be attending the swap meet that day. Ross devoted much time beforehand to plotting an ambush as he planned to have the Comancheros encircle the Bandidos when they arrived at the Viking Tavern. Ross and the Comancheros had arrived first at about 1 pm, armed and ready for a fight should the Bandidos arrive.  Ross planned to use himself as a bait by standing in the center with the rest of the Comancheros would stage a "bullhorn" ambush. Ross had learned about the "horns of the bull" ambush tactic used by the impis (regiments) of the Zulus in the 19th century from a history book he had read. The plan was aborted when the Bandidos failed to arrive at the time they were expected. 

The Bandidos were half a hour late to the swap meet. Ross had failed to anticipate that Spencer and the other Bandidos would also be well armed as the Comancheros. By the time Bandidos arrived, the Comancheros were out of formation, giving up the advantage of a strong defensive position. Ross had gone into the Viking Tavern to drink and was still drinking when the Bandidos finally arrived. During the clash in the parking lot of the Viking Tavern, the Comancheros and Bandidos fought each other with their fists, baseball bats and guns. Upon hearing the shooting out in the parking lot, Ross left his pint of beer, ran outside waving about a machete in the air and shouted "Kill 'em all!", only to be shot down by the Bandidos. By the time the police arrived, four Comancheros, two Bandidos and Leanne Walters, an innocent teenage girl caught in the crossfire, were all dead. Ross took a bullet to the brain and shrapnel in his chest, but survived his wounds.

Trial and Imprisonment
In the aftermath of the massacre, 43 men were charged with murder. Ross was charged with "constructive first degree murder", meaning that though he had not killed anyone himself that the Crown felt he was responsible for the killings. The Crown in its indictment of Ross alleged that his position as the Comanchero national president; his orders to his followers to arm themselves beforehand with a variety of weapons; and his order for the Comancheros to go to the Viking Tavern in the full knowledge that violence was likely to occur made him just as guilty as the men who actually killed during the Viking Tavern incident. The trial under Justice Anthony Roden lasted 332 days and cost $12 million Australian dollars, making it one of the most longest and expensive trials in Australian history. Ross was convicted of first-degree murder and sentenced to life imprisonment with Roden chiding him as one of the men most responsible for the shoot-out at the Viking Tavern. Justice Roden in his verdict stated that: "Ross was primarily responsible for the decision that members of his club go to Milperra in force and armed". Ross served his sentence at the Long Bay Central Industrial Prison. 

In 1989, an appeal court agreed to hear Ross's appeal of the verdict and in 1992 an appeal court ruled in his favor. Ross's conviction was reduced from murder to manslaughter, which reduced his sentence. Ross served a total of 5 years and three months in prison and was released on parole on 7 December 1989 per the "complicated" parole rules in Australia. Ross received an automatic one-third remission in his sentence because it was his first major criminal conviction and received further remissions in his sentence by taking adult education courses and industrial skills courses. Raymond "Sunshine" Kucler deposed Ross as the "Supreme Leader" of the Comancheros.

Later life
Ross together with his wife Vanessa settled in the Wiseman's Ferry area in rural New South Wales after his release from prison. In a 2019 interview Ross stated: ""We got here in late '93 and, um, the January fires started. All this place was on fire, so I went down to help, and I stayed. I'm still there, 25 years later." Ross worked as a volunteer captain with the New South Wales Rural Fire Service at Spencer. Ross states that his body is still full of shotgun pellets from the Father's Day massacre as he noted that he took: "Quite a few shots...head, neck, chest, face". In an interview in 1994 to mark the 10th anniversary of the massacre, Ross stated: “I can look at myself in the mirror and know that I was not to blame...I did not cause what happened. Of course I regret what happened. I lost four good men and we got totally screwed. I was the one who ended up being shot up, so how could I have killed anyone? They judged me for who I am, not what I did." In the 2012 television mini-series Bikie Wars: Brothers in Arms, Jock Ross was played by Matt Nable.  

In September 2019, Ross was badly injured when he was run over by  Nicola Annabel Teo, the daughter of the famous brain surgeon Charlie Teo. The police have alleged that Teo was engaged in careless driving at the time of the traffic incident. Ross was in a coma for four months after the accident and both of his legs had to fitted with titanium plates to allow him to walk again. On 21 June 2021, the Crown dropped the charges against Teo just hours before she was due to go on trial on charges of "dangerous driving occasioning grievous bodily harm".

Books

References

Living people
1943 births
20th-century Australian criminals
Australian male criminals
Australian organised crime figures
Australian crime bosses
Scottish emigrants to Australia
People from Gorbals
Criminals from Glasgow
Criminals from New South Wales
Organised crime in Sydney
Australian firefighters
Scottish military engineers
British Army personnel
Shooting survivors
People convicted of murder by New South Wales
Australian people convicted of murder
Australian people convicted of manslaughter
Prisoners sentenced to life imprisonment by New South Wales
Australian prisoners sentenced to life imprisonment
Scottish prisoners sentenced to life imprisonment
Scottish people imprisoned abroad